Christian "Chris" Franzen (December 11, 1845 – March 19, 1920) was an American politician, farmer, and businessman.

Born in Holstein, Germany, Franzen was a cabin boy. In 1863, Franzen emigrated to the United States, went to Wisconsin, in 1870, and settled in Marathon County, Wisconsin in 1876. He was a farmer in the town of Bergen. In 1903, he moved to Stratford, Wisconsin, Franzen was in the insurance, telephone, and bank business. He served on the Marathon County Board of Supervisors and was chairman of the board. He also served as town school clerk and town assessor. In 1915, Franzen served in the Wisconsin State Assembly and was a Democrat.

Notes

1845 births
1920 deaths
German emigrants to the United States
People from Marathon County, Wisconsin
Businesspeople from Wisconsin
Farmers from Wisconsin
County supervisors in Wisconsin
School board members in Wisconsin
Democratic Party members of the Wisconsin State Assembly
People from Stratford, Wisconsin